Ty, Tay, Tyler or Taylor Brown may refer to:

Politicians
Taylor G. Brown (1890–1957), American state senator from Wisconsin
Taylor Brown (Montana politician), American state legislator elected in 2008

Sportsmen
Tay Brown (1911–1994), American football player
Taylor Brown (basketball) (born 1989), American power forward
Tyler Brown (ice hockey) (born 1990), Canadian left winger
Tyler Brown (footballer) (born 1999), Australian rules midfielder
Ty Brown, American sprinter in 2018 USA Outdoor Track and Field Championships